Muzaffer Göksenin (Manastir, Ottoman Empire, 1899 - Istanbul, 31 January 1965) was Turkish soldier and diplomat. Göksenin is a retired second Turkish Air Forces commander and general.

Early life
In 1916, at the age of sixteen, he was taken from Kuleli Military High School with his friends and joined the army in 1916 as a Cavalry Ensign. In 1917, the 26th division participated in the Palestine Campaign in the Cavalry Division. He was captured by the British around Damascus in October 1918 and returned to Istanbul after captivity. He went to Anatolia in 1920 and joined the national forces and served on the Western front in the Turkish War of Independence. He is among the "Nine Officers" who entered Izmir first among the cavalry units under the command of General Fahrettin Altay.

He was the architect of the establishment of the Turkish Air Force, which was established as an independent power at the end of the World War II, together with Lieutenant General Muzaffer Ergüder and General Zeki Doğan. He is the first Turkish commander to put into effect the modernization of the Turkish air fleet. Beginning in 1951, he made the transition from piston aircraft to jet aircraft. He founded the "Air Force Cooperative", which was first inspired by the PX and later formed the basis for the "Army Cooperative" (ORKO).

In 1953, as a result of a disagreement with the Turkish Minister of National Defense Seyfi Kurtbek, he asked for his retirement. Turkish Prime Minister Adnan Menderes invited him to return to the army again. He rejected this proposal of the Prime Minister and retired on 4 May 1953.

Death

Göksenin, who was the recipient of the "War Medal" and the "Red Stripe Medal of Independence", died on January 31, 1965, at the age of 66. His body was buried in Zincirlikuyu Cemetery in Istanbul. He was married and had two children.

References

External links

 

1899 births
Living people
Turkish Air Force generals
Commanders of the Turkish Air Force
1965 deaths